The 1946 Kilmarnock by-election was a by-election held on 5 December 1946 for the British House of Commons constituency of Kilmarnock in Ayrshire.

Vacancy 
The seat had become vacant on 2 October 1946 when the Labour Member of Parliament (MP), Clarice Shaw had resigned her seat. She died on 27 October at the age of 63.

Shaw had held the seat since the general election in July 1945, but ill-health had prevented her from ever attending the House of Commons.

Candidates 
The Labour Party candidate was 35-year-old Willie Ross, a schoolteacher before World War II who was recently demobilised from the British Army, where he had risen to the rank of Major.  At the 1945 general election he had unsuccessfully contested the Ayr Burghs constituency.

The Unionist candidate was Lieutenant-Colonel George E. O. Walker, who had also been the Unionist candidate at the general election. The Scottish National Party fielded George Dott.

Result 
The result was a victory for Ross, who held the seat with a fractionally increased share of the vote. He held the seat until he stepped down at the 1979 general election, having been Secretary of State for Scotland for two periods totalling 8 years.

Votes

See also
Kilmarnock (UK Parliament constituency)
Kilmarnock
1929 Kilmarnock by-election
1933 Kilmarnock by-election
List of United Kingdom by-elections (1931–1950)
Elections in Scotland

References

Sources 

By-elections to the Parliament of the United Kingdom in Scottish constituencies
Kilmarnock by-election
Kilmarnock by-election, 1946
Kilmarnock by-election
Kilmarnock by-election
Politics of Kilmarnock